General Chung Ho-yong (born 10 September 1932) is a South Korean politician and army general, who was held the positions of minister of the interior and later minister of defense.

He is considered as one of the best friends of Chun Doo-hwan and Roh Tae-woo, who both served as President of South Korea.

References

External links

 Jeong Ho-yong : Republic of Korea National Assembly - Profile
 역대 정무부처 장차관 
 5·6공 주역, 정호용 전 국방장관 :“나는 친구 노태우에게 배신당했다” 

1932 births
Living people
South Korean military personnel
People from North Gyeongsang Province
Democratic Justice Party politicians
South Korean anti-communists
Kyeongbuk High School alumni
Konkuk University alumni
Korean military personnel of the Vietnam War
Korea Military Academy alumni
Chiefs of Staff of the Army (South Korea)
Members of the National Assembly (South Korea)